Hillar Shahabad is a village in Doru Tehsil in the Anantnag district of Jammu and Kashmir, India.

Nowgam shahabad is also a village in Doru Tehsil in The Anantnag District of Jammu and Kashmir, 192212

This Said Above village is very beautiful and a Big village in Doru Tehsil. 192212

Demographics
Kashmiri is the local language. People also speak Urdu and English.

References

Villages in Anantnag district